El Caco is a stoner rock band from Lillestrøm in Norway.

Musicians 
 Øyvind Osa – lead vocals, bass
 Fredrik Wallumrød – drums
 Anders Gjesti – guitar

Former musician
 Thomas Fredriksen – drums (1999–2007)

Discography 
Albums
 Viva 12" vinyl (2001)
 Solid Rest 10" double vinyl (2003)
 The Search (2005)
 From Dirt (2007)
 Heat 12" vinyl  (2009)
 Hatred, Love & Diagrams 12" vinyl (2012)
 7 12" vinyl (2016)

External links 
elcaco.com – Official website

Norwegian rock music groups